In enzymology, a phloretin hydrolase is an enzyme that catalyzes the chemical reaction

phloretin + H2O  phloretate + phloroglucinol

Thus, the two substrates of this enzyme are phloretin and H2O, whereas its two products are phloretate and phloroglucinol.

This enzyme belongs to the family of hydrolases, specifically those acting on carbon–carbon bonds in ketonic substances.  The systematic name of this enzyme class is 2',4,4',6'-tetrahydroxydehydrochalcone 1,3,5-trihydroxybenzenehydrolase. This enzyme is also called lactase-phlorizin hydrolase.

References 

 

EC 3.7.1
Enzymes of unknown structure
Dihydrochalcones metabolism